Dark Skies is an American 1990s television series.

Dark Skies may also refer to:
 Dark Skies (1929 film), an American drama film directed by  Harry S. Webb
 Dark Skies (2013 film), an American science fiction horror film
 Dark Skies (album), a 2018 album by Fit for a King
 "Dark Skies", a 2016 song by Emma Pollock from In Search of Harperfield

See also
 "Dark Sky", a song by Jimmy Somerville
 Dark Sky (app), a smartphone app providing weather reports bought by Apple Inc. in 2020
Dark Sky Distance, a professional running group
 Dark-sky movement, a campaign to reduce light pollution
 Dark-sky preserve, areas protected for naturally dark night skies
 Nighttime
 Olbers' paradox, the "dark sky at night" paradox
 Overcast
 Solar eclipse